Swaraijam Kamini Thakur Singha was an Indian politician and a member of the Tripura Legislative Assembly from Khowai Assembly constituency in 1977 election.

References 

Tripura MLAs 1977–1983
Communist Party of India (Marxist) politicians from Tripura
2009 deaths
Year of birth unknown